Marasović is a surname. Notable people with the surname include:

Nevio Marasović (born 1983), Croatian film director, screenwriter, and commercial director
Željko Marasović (1951–2021), Croatian American pianist, organist, and composer

Croatian surnames